Lophostethus is a genus of moths in the family Sphingidae first described by Arthur Gardiner Butler in 1876.

Species
Lophostethus dumolinii (Angas, 1849)
Lophostethus negus Jordan, 1926

References

Smerinthini
Moth genera
Taxa named by Arthur Gardiner Butler